Francisco Mata (July 24, 1932 – January 24, 2011) was a Venezuelan singer and composer.

See also
Venezuela
Venezuelan music

Sources
  Fundación Glorias del Folklore

1932 births
2011 deaths
Venezuelan composers
Male composers
Venezuelan folk singers